Richard Washington was Provost of Trinity College Dublin from 1640 to 1641. Following the Irish rebellion of 1641, Washington and most of the fellows were forced to flee to England.

References

Year of birth missing
Year of death missing
Provosts of Trinity College Dublin